The Minister for Enterprise, Trade and Employment is a senior minister in the Government of Ireland and leads the Department of Enterprise, Trade and Employment.

The current Minister for Enterprise, Trade and Employment is Simon Coveney, TD.

He is assisted by two Ministers of State:
Dara Calleary, TD – Minister of State for Trade Promotion, Digital and Company Regulation
Neale Richmond, TD – Minister of State for Employment Affairs and Retail Businesses

Overview
The Minister heads one of the most important economic departments in the Irish Government, responsible for the implementation of policy in five key areas – Enterprise, Innovation, Growth; Quality, Work and Learning; Making Markets and Regulation work better; Quality, Value and Continuous Improvement; and the European Union. A large element of the work of the Department arises from Ireland's membership of a number of international organisations, in particular the European Union and the World Trade Organization. The Department plays an active role in the development of EU and WTO policies, particularly to ensure that Ireland's interests are protected. The Department is organised into five divisions. They are:

Innovation and Investment Division
Enterprise and Trade Division
Commerce, Consumer and Competition Division
Employment Rights and Industrial Relations Division
Corporate Services

List of office-holders

Notes

References

Government ministers of the Republic of Ireland
Lists of government ministers of Ireland
Economy of the Republic of Ireland
Minister